The Kermadec Trench is a linear ocean trench in the south Pacific Ocean. Together with the Tonga Trench to the north, it forms the -long, near-linear Kermadec-Tonga subduction system, which began to evolve in the Eocene when the Pacific Plate started to subduct beneath the Australian Plate. Convergence rates along this subduction system are among the fastest on Earth, /yr in the north and /yr in the south.

Geology
Formed by the subduction of the Pacific Plate under the Indo-Australian Plate, it runs parallel with and to the east of the Kermadec Ridge and island arc. The Tonga Trench marks the continuation of subduction to the north.

The Kermadec Trench has a southern continuation in the turbidite-filled Hikurangi Trough, but a series of seamounts on the Australian Plate act as a dam and prevents this turbidity from reaching the sediment-starved Kermadec Trench. Debris from a larger subducted seamount probably dammed the trench from 2 Ma to 0.5 Ma and similar events probably redirected sediments in similar ways before that.

Two oceanic plates meet at the Kermadec Trench which is located far from any larger landmass. The trench is almost perfectly straight and its simple geometry is the result of the uniformity of the subducting sea-floor. This sea-floor formed at the extinct Osbourn Trough, located just north of the Louisville Seamount Chain. Abyssal hills on the subducting sea-floor are oriented perpendicular to the old spreading centre and the sea-floor is 72–80 Ma near the Louisville seamounts at the northern end and more than 100 Ma near Hikurangi Plateau at the southern end.

The Hikurangi Plateau formed part of the Ontong-Java-Manihiki-Hikurangi large igneous province (LIP) during the Ontong Java Event 120 . The Manihiki Plateau is currently subducting under the southern part of the Kermadec Arc but most of it has already been subducted.

Fauna
In 2012, deep sea researchers discovered individuals of a species of giant amphipod at the trench's lowest depths. Unlike most amphipods, which are approximately 2.5 cm (1 inch) long, this species reaches up to 34 cm (13 inches) in length, and is milky-white.

The second-deepest fish, the hadal snailfish Notoliparis kermadecensis, is endemic to the trench and occupies a very limited depth range, .

All other known pearlfishes live in the range  and the presence of E. neotes at this depth remains unexplained.

Exploration
In May 2014, the Nereus, an unmanned research submarine operated by the Woods Hole Oceanographic Institution (WHOI), imploded due to high pressure at a depth of 9,990 metres while exploring the Kermadec Trench.

In December 2022, a research team from the Chinese Academy of Sciences and National Institute of Water and Atmospheric Research reached the bottom of the Scholl Deep nearly 10 km below the surface.

See also 
 Kermadec Islands
 Monowai Seamount
 Tonga-Kermadec Ridge

References
Notes

Bibliography

External links
   An animation of a 3D model of the Kermadec Trench

Zealandia
Geography of the Kermadec Islands
Geography of the New Zealand seabed
Oceanic trenches of the Pacific Ocean
Subduction zones